Michael A. Fantini is a retired United States Air Force major general who last served as the commander of the Air Force Warfighting Integration Capability. Previously, he was the director of global power programs in the Office of the Assistant Secretary of the Air Force for Acquisition. Fantini earned a bachelor's degree in mechanical engineering from The Catholic University of America in 1986. He later received a master's degree in aeronautical science from Embry–Riddle Aeronautical University in 1996 and a master's degree in national security studies from the National War College in 2005.

References

External links
 

 

Year of birth missing (living people)
Living people
Place of birth missing (living people)
Catholic University of America alumni
Embry–Riddle Aeronautical University alumni
National War College alumni
Recipients of the Legion of Merit
United States Air Force generals
Recipients of the Defense Superior Service Medal